Jashak (also Romanized as Jāshak; also known as Chāshk) is a village in Abdan Rural District, in the Central District of Deyr County, Bushehr Province, Iran. At the 2006 census, its population was 123, in 24 families.

See also 
Jashak salt dome

References 

Populated places in Deyr County